Letis is a genus of moths in the family Erebidae. The genus was erected by Jacob Hübner in 1821.

Selected species
Letis hercyna (Drury, 1773)
Letis magna Gmelin, 1789
Letis orcynia Druce, 1890 – marbled witch
Letis scops Guenée, 1852 – scops witch moth
Letis specularis Hübner, 1821 (type species)
Letis xylia Guenée, 1852

References

Thermesiini
Moth genera